Police Force is a 1989 Williams pinball machine. The pinball machine was initially supposed to be released as Batman pinball, the police car was to be the Batmobile and the Jail was to be the Bat Cave. The machine features anthropomorphic jungle animals in the roles of police and robbers.

The game features scoring by hitting each of the targets of the animals. As the targets of each animal are struck, a light of each lights up showing them in jail.  The game also features scoring on a center ramp with unlimited shots of one million each after a series of shots, and a multi-ball.  On the third ball of the game, players can shoot the right ramp twice, and add the highest current score to their own.

Rules
The game features anthropomorphic jungle animals in the roles of cops and robbers, and stars a lion and leopard as the two main police officers the player assumes the role of when playing the game.  The object of the game is to arrest the four main criminals and then score the progressive jackpot.

Firing Range (Skill Shot)
When starting the game, use the plunger to shoot the ball and score a randomly selected value between 10,000 and 100,000 points, determined by hitting a special target spinner.  If the ball doesn't reach the spinner, it will drop back into the handcuff bonus trap, and the player scores 10,000 multiplied by the number of the ball in play (i.e. 10,000 x Ball 2, which is 20,000).

GUN Rollovers
At the top of the playfield are three rollovers that spell out G-U-N.  Spelling the word GUN advances the bonus multiplier (which caps off at 6X), and allows the jackpot to increase for 10 seconds; when the ball hits any bumpers or target, the jackpot increases.

Bonus is multiplied by lighting all three G-U-N lanes (lit lanes change with flippers). When the multiplier increases, the jackpot is increased by all targets for a period of time. The end of ball bonus is then multiplied by whatever the multiplier is up to. On most games, the multiplier is carried over to subsequent balls if it is 2X or 3X. If the multiplier is above 3X, then it is reset to 1X on the next ball. Special is lit when the multiplier is maxed out (6X), and the player spells GUN again.

Criminal Targets
There are four specific criminals to arrest: the loan shark, the machine gun crocodile, the diamond weasel, and the drug rat.  The shark, rat, and weasel can all be arrested by hitting all three proper targets with each animal.  The shark's targets are on the left, while the weasel's are on the right, and the rat's targets are close to the center of the table next to the right ramp.  To arrest the crocodile, shoot the ball into the Hot Sheet ball trap.  Lights within the characters' bodies flash until they are arrested.

Once all four criminals are in jail, the player is eligible to score the jackpot, and the process resets.

Handcuff Bonus
Shoot the Handcuff target on the right side of the playfield (indicated by a flashing green arrow placed just under the weasel's targets) to score a handcuff bonus.  The bonus can either be an incremental score, or 10,000 points times the number of the ball in play if the ball hits the trap from the plunger.

Hot Sheet Value
Scores one of five values when lit at the Croc kickout: Hot Score (mystery), Hot Extra Ball, 5 Free Games, Spot P-O-L-I-C-E, and Hot Multi-Ball. Hot Multi-Ball is only awarded if one ball is already locked.  Shooting this trap also puts the crocodile in jail if he hasn't been arrested already.

Jackpot
Contrary to other pinball machines, Jackpot can be collected without the need of Multi-Ball. To light the Jackpot on the right ramp, all four criminals must be put in jail (Croc, Shark, Rat, and Weasel). Criminals in jail are indicated in the upper left part of the playfield above the Croc Kickout.  When all four are incarcerated, Jackpot is lit and is collected by one shot up the right ramp. Value ranges from a minimum of 1,000,000 to a maximum of 4,000,000 and is increased for a period of time (10 seconds) after G-U-N is spelled.

The player has only 15 seconds after arresting the last criminal to win the jackpot.  When it is won, it resets to 1 million points.

Multi-Ball
Contrary to other pinball machines, Multi-Ball has no special features attached to it, because it is not necessary to have Multi-Ball active in order to win the Jackpot.  To activate multi-ball, shoot the ball up the right ramp when lock is lit.  At the start of the game, the lock is lit to begin with; on subsequent multi-ball attempts, the player needs to first arrest a criminal before activating the lock.  When the lock is not lit, shooting the ball up the right ramp instead spots a letter in the word "POLICE."  Shooting the ball up the ramp a second time (or hitting the Croc kickout after one ball is locked) starts Multi-Ball.

P-O-L-I-C-E Letters
Letters are spotted by shooting the right ramp when lock is not lit, with a 75K Skill Shot, or from the Hot Sheet. Spotting all 6 letters lights the TOP COP BONUS (collected at the top of the playfield in a half-orbit shot that leads to the GUN rollovers) for 3,000,000 points. TOP COP stays lit until collected or the end of the current ball, whichever comes first.

Letters can also be lit during multi-ball when shooting one of the two balls up the right ramp.

Unlimited Millions
The middle ramp offers large bonuses if consecutive shots are made.  The first shot is worth 50,000 points; to score successive shots, the player must make the ramp shot again within a short time and without hitting any targets, bumpers, or rollovers.  The successive shots if done successfully score 75,000 points, 100,000, 150,000, and then 1 million points each time in succession (the unlimited millions).  After an unlimited million is scored, the TOP COP bonus is lit once the ramp shot is missed or the time expires.  Players can also win an extra ball at the TOP COP target when the unlimited millions is lit.

Take Highest Score
On the last ball only, shooting the ball up the right ramp twice adds the highest score achieved up to that point in the game (and only that game) to the player's own score; the player is only allowed one opportunity at this once the first shot has been made, however; hitting any other targets or going up the wrong section counts as a miss.  If an extra ball is earned, the player gets another chance at taking the highest score if it wasn't achieved.

If only one player is playing and successfully shoots the ball up the right ramp twice, or if the player in the lead successfully shoots the ball up the right ramp twice, this essentially doubles the player's score.

Digital versions
This pinball machine was included in the Atari Lynx game Pinball Jam alongside Elvira and the Party Monsters.

References

External links
 Internet Pinball Database entry
 Internet Pinball Serial Number database entry

1989 pinball machines
Williams pinball machines
Pinball video games
Atari Lynx games
Atari Lynx-only games